The 2017 Race of Champions was the 28th running of the event, and took place over 21–22 January 2017 at Marlins Park baseball stadium in Miami. Juan Pablo Montoya took the Championship and became the champion for the first time. Sebastian Vettel, after teammate Pascal Wehrlein was sidelined after a crash, single-handedly won the Nations' Cup for Germany.

Participants

Nations' Cup

There were three groups of uneven size, with a format which ensured North American participation in the final.

The top two teams from Group A (USA/Canada) would progress to Semi-Final A, with the winners of Groups B (Europe) and C (South America) progressing to Semi-Final B; the winners of the two Semi-Finals would face off in the final.

Group stage

Group A

Group B

Group C

Knockout stage

Race of Champions

Group stage

Group A

Group B

Group C

Group D

Knockout stage

Footnotes

References

External links 

 

2017
2010s in Miami
2017 in American motorsport
2017 in motorsport
2017 in sports in Florida
January 2017 sports events in the United States
Motorsport competitions in Florida
Motorsport in Miami
Sports competitions in Miami
International sports competitions hosted by the United States